The Journal of Occupational and Environmental Hygiene is a monthly peer-reviewed journal covering occupational and environmental medicine, especially in regards to hygiene. It was established in 2004 by the merger of Applied Occupational and Environmental Hygiene and AIHA Journal. It is published by Taylor & Francis along with the American Industrial Hygiene Association and the American Conference of Governmental Industrial Hygienists, of which it is the official journal. The editor-in-chief is Mark Nicas (University of California, Berkeley). According to the Journal Citation Reports, the journal has a 2017 impact factor of 1.462.

References

External links

Environmental health journals
Occupational safety and health journals
Publications established in 2004
Monthly journals
Taylor & Francis academic journals
English-language journals
Academic journals published by learned and professional societies of the United States